Orlické Podhůří is a municipality in the Ústí nad Orlicí District in the Pardubice Region of the Czech Republic. It has about 700 inhabitants.

Administrative parts
The municipality is made up of villages of Dobrá Voda, Říčky and Rviště.

References

Villages in Ústí nad Orlicí District